A lead star is a low-metallicity star with an overabundance of lead and bismuth as compared to other products of the S-process.

See also 
 Barium star

References 

Astrophysics
Nucleosynthesis
Star types